The Round Mountain, one of three peaks of the same name in the region, is a mountain located on the Main Range of the Snowy Mountains, part of the Great Dividing Range, in southeastern New South Wales, Australia.

The summit is located close to the Khancoban-Cabramurra Road. A major fire trail running from the main road, makes Round Mountain a popular starting location for hiking and cross-country skiing expeditions.

Similar to other peaks in the area, it is covered by scrub on its lower slopes and in the more elevated areas it is clear and grassy.

See also 

 List of mountains in New South Wales

References

Mountains of New South Wales
Ski areas and resorts in New South Wales
Snowy Mountains